A number of trigraphs are found in the Latin script.

A

It also represents  in Tibetan Pinyin, where it is alternatively written ⟨än⟩.

B–C

It should not be confused with ch, which represents  (a voiceless postalveolar fricative).

It is only used within roots; when two  are brought together in a compound word, they form the regular sequence .

 is used in for  Corsican.
 

D
 is used for the prevoiced aspirated affricate  in Juǀʼhoan.

 is used for the dental affricate  in Chipewyan.

 is a long Hungarian , . It is not used within roots, where  may be either long or short; but when an assimilated suffix is added to the stem, it may form the trigraph rather than the regular sequence *. Examples are eddze, lopóddzon.

 is used for the prevoiced uvularized affricate  in Juǀʼhoan.

 is used for the foreign sound  in German. A common variant is the tetragraph . It is used in Juǀʼhoan for the prevoiced aspirated affricate .

 is used for foreign loan words with  Norwegian. Sometimes the digraph dj is used.

 is used for the voiced palatal click  in Naro.

In the practical orthography of Taa, where it represents the prevoiced affricate .

 is used for  when it precedes a vowel and  otherwise in Polish, and is considered a variant of the digraph dź appearing in other situations.

 is used for the voiced palato-alveolar affricate  in Hungarian

 is used for the prevoiced uvularized affricate  in Juǀʼhoan.

 is used for the whistled sibilant affricate  in Shona.

E

G

 is used for ejective  in Hadza.

It is only used within roots; when two  are brought together in a compound

 is used for a labialized velar/uvular  in Chipewyan. In Canadian Tlingit it represents , which is written  in Alaska.

 is used for /ŋn/ in Talossan.

E.g. aiguë "sharp" and ambiguë "ambiguous".

 is used for the prevoiced affricate  in the practical orthography of Taa.

    are used in Juǀʼhoan for its four prevoiced aspirated clicks, .

    are used in Juǀʼhoan for its four prevoiced affricate ejective-contour clicks, .

    are used in Juǀʼhoan for its four prevoiced affricate pulmonic-contour clicks, .

H–I 
 is used for a labialized velar/uvular  in Chipewyan.

 is used for the aspirated voiceless post-alveolar affricate  in some romanizations of Burmese ချ or ခြ.

 represents  in Afrikaans.

It was eliminated in the French spelling reform of 1990, but continues to be used.

 is used for the strident vowel  in the practical orthography of Taa.

J–L
The digraph  represents .

 is used for  after  in a few French words, such as coquillier.

It is only used within roots; when two  are brought together in a compound word, they form the regular sequence .

N

In Xhosa is represents .

In Welsh, it represents a voiceless velar nasal (a  under the nasal mutation). In Xhosa,  represents a murmured velar nasal.

 is used for voiceless  in Gogo.

 is used for a back velar stop, in Yanyuwa

 is used for doubly articulated consonant  in Yélî Dnye of Papua New Guinea.

 is used in for  the Romanized Popular Alphabet used to write Hmong.

 is used for the alveolar click  in Xhosa.

 is used for the prenasalized lateral click  in Xhosa.

 is used in Inuktitut and Greenlandic to write a long (geminate) velar nasal, .

 is a long Hungarian , . It is only used within roots; when two  are brought together in a compound word, they form the regular sequence .

 is used for the click  in Naro.

In the transcription of Australian Aboriginal languages such as Yanyuwa it represents a dental stop, .

In Malagasy it represents .

In Gogo it's voiceless .

 is used for a pre-velar stop,  in Yanyuwa.

 is used for the prenasalized whistled sibilant  in Shona.

 is used for the alveolar murmured nasal click  in Juǀʼhoan

 is used for the dental murmured nasal click  in Juǀʼhoan.

 is used for the lateral murmured nasal click  in Juǀʼhoan.

 is used for the palatal murmured nasal click  in Juǀʼhoan.

O

 is that represents a Walloon nasal vowel.

In Tibetan Pinyin, it represents  and is alternately ön.

 is used for the strident vowel  in the practical orthography of Taa.

P–R

 is used in Kuanua, in  "water".

 is used for the affricate  in the practical orthography of Taa.

 is used for the sje sound  in Swedish in the word gärdsgård /'jæɧgo:ɖ/ (roundpole fence).

 is used for a retroflex stop  in Yanyuwa.

 is used for the sje sound  in Swedish as in the word marskalk /'maɧalk/ (marshal).

S
It is used for the sje sound /ɧ/ in Swedish at the end of a French loanword, e.g. marsch (fr. marche), or in Greek loanwords, such as schema (schedule) and ischias. An exception is the word  (from the Late Latin schedula), where it can be  or  depending on dialect. In Dutch it may represent word-final [s], as in the common suffix -isch and in some (sur)names, like Bosch and Den Bosch.

It uses  with an arc below so as to denote .

 is used in Hungarian for [ʃtʃ].

 is used in Gwich'in for [ʂ].

 is used in romanization of Bulgarian for the letter щ, which represents [ʃt].

 represents a fricative phoneme  in some Scandinavian languages. In Faroese (e.g. at skjóta, to shoot) and in Norwegian (e.g. kanskje, maybe) it is a usually the voiceless postalveolar fricative . In Swedish (e.g. skjorta, shirt) it is often realised as the sje sound .

It is used in a few French loanwords in Swedish for the sje sound /ɧ/, e.g. assiett (dessert plate).

 is used for the sje sound  in a few Swedish words between two short vowels, such as hässja (hayrack).

 is found in words of Greek origin.

 is used for the sje sound  in 5 native Swedish words, it can also represent the voiceless postalveolar fricative  or the consonant cluster  in Norwegian depending on dialect.

 is a long Hungarian , . It is only used within roots; when two  are brought together in a compound word, they form the regular sequence .

T
 is used for the click  in Naro.

 is used for the aspirated click  in Naro, the aspirated affricate  in Sandawe, Hadza and Juǀʼhoan, and the affricate  in French and Portuguese. In Swedish it is used for the affricate  in a small number of English loanwords, such as match and batch.

 is used for the uvularized affricate  in Juǀʼhoan.

It is often replaced with the ambiguous trigraph .

 is used in various languages, such as Juǀʼhoan, for the aspirated affricate . In the Romanized Popular Alphabet used to write Hmong, it represents the sound .

 is used for the whistled sibilant affricate  in Shona.

 is used for the uvularized affricate  in Juǀʼhoan.

 is used for dental affricate  in Chipewyan.

 is used for ejective  in Haida (Bringhurst orthography).

 is used for ejective  in Haida (Bringhurst orthography).

It is only used within roots; when two  are brought together in a compound word, they form the regular sequence .

U–Z

 is used for the strident vowel  in the practical orthography of Taa.

 is used in English for a variety of sounds. When the trigraph follows certain letters, the letter will become postalveolar.

 is used for [ʃtʃ] in a few Spanish and Portuguese names such as Yaxchilán.

 is used for [ʃtʃ] in a few Basque and Catalan names such as Borxtx and Xtxi.

It is only used within roots; when two  are brought together in a compound word, they form the regular sequence .

Other

    are used in Juǀʼhoan for its four aspirated nasal clicks, .

    are used in Khoekhoe for its four plain aspirated clicks, .

Latin-script trigraphs